Matthew L. Chatham (born June 28, 1977) is a former American football linebacker. He played college football at South Dakota. He played in the National Football League (NFL) for the New England Patriots and New York Jets.

High school years
Chatham attended Sioux City North High School in Sioux City, Iowa, and won All-State honors in football and baseball.

College career
Chatham attended the University of South Dakota. As a junior, he made 95 tackles and six interceptions. In his senior year he made 74 tackles and one interception. He was a double major in English and Criminal Justice at South Dakota.

Chatham received a Masters in Business Administration from Babson College in 2011.

NFL career
Chatham was signed by the St. Louis Rams as a rookie free agent but was released before the start of the regular season.

He spent the first six seasons of his career in New England, including contributing to three of the Patriots' Super Bowl victories (XXXVI, XXXVIII, XXXIX). He was known as one of the leaders of the Patriots' special teams. During the 2003 season, he recorded his first and only NFL touchdown when he recovered a Tiki Barber fumble in a game against the New York Giants and returned it for a 38-yard touchdown. XXXVIII, he tackled streaker Mark Roberts, who had come onto the field just before the second-half kickoff.

NFL career statistics

Regular season

Retirement career
Chatham now runs an NFL informational column in the Boston Herald called "The Chatham Report" and appears every Sunday morning on WEEI with Kevin Faulk, Dale Arnold and Christopher Price. He can be found on Twitter under @chatham58.  He is a regular columnist on the Football By Football website. Chatham is also an in-studio football analyst with NESN.

He has also received his MBA from Babson College and has started a creperie restaurant franchise called Skycrepers.

References

External links
NFL.com Bio
ESPN's Greatest Super Bowl moments
SI Vault article with Matt Chatham quotes about tackling the streaker

1977 births
Living people
American football linebackers
Babson College alumni
South Dakota Coyotes football players
New England Patriots players
New York Jets players
People from Newton, Iowa
Players of American football from Iowa
Sportspeople from Sioux City, Iowa
North High School (Sioux City, Iowa) alumni